Benthenchelys is a genus of deep sea eels in the snake-eel family Ophichthidae, with these species:

 Benthenchelys cartieri Fowler, 1934
 Benthenchelys indicus Castle, 1972
 Benthenchelys pacificus Castle, 1972

References

 

Ophichthidae